Niklas Tarnat (born 26 May 1998) is a German professional footballer who plays as a midfielder for Rot-Weiss Essen.

Career
Tarnat made his professional debut for Hannover 96 in the 2. Bundesliga on 3 January 2021, coming on as a substitute in the 88th minute for Dominik Kaiser against SV Sandhausen. The home match finished as a 4–0 win for Hannover. He left the club ahead of the 2021–22 season.

Personal life
Tarnat is the son of former Germany national team player Michael Tarnat.

References

External links
 
 
 
 

1998 births
Living people
People from Solingen
German footballers
Association football midfielders
2. Bundesliga players
Regionalliga players
FC Bayern Munich II players
Hannover 96 II players
Hannover 96 players
Rot-Weiss Essen players